This is a list of events from British radio in 1950.

Events
6 June – the BBC Light Programme first broadcasts Educating Archie, featuring ventriloquist Peter Brough and his schoolboy doll Archie Andrews (sic.); the series runs for 10 years and averages 15 million listeners.
7 June – The Archers pilot episodes debut on BBC radio; the series will still be running 70 years later, and actress June Spencer, who appears in the opening pilot, will still be appearing up to her 103rd birthday.
5 November – the BBC Light Programme first broadcasts Life with the Lyons, the UK's first sitcom, featuring British-domiciled American couple Ben Lyon and Bebe Daniels.

Debuts
16 January – Listen with Mother, on the BBC Light Programme (1950–1982)
6 June – Educating Archie, on the BBC Light Programme (1950–1960)
7 June – The Archers, pilot episode (1950–Present)
5 November – Life with the Lyons, on the BBC Light Programme (1950–1961)

Continuing radio programmes

1930s
 In Town Tonight (1933–1960)

1940s
 Music While You Work (1940–1967)
 Sunday Half Hour (1940–2018)
 Desert Island Discs (1942–Present)
 Family Favourites (1945–1980)
 Down Your Way (1946–1992)
 Have A Go (1946–1967)
 Housewives' Choice (1946–1967)
 Letter from America (1946–2004)
 Woman's Hour (1946–Present)
 Twenty Questions (1947–1976)
 Any Questions? (1948–Present)
 Mrs Dale's Diary (1948–1969)
 Take It from Here (1948–1960)
 Billy Cotton Band Show (1949–1968)
 A Book at Bedtime (1949–Present)
 Ray's a Laugh (1949–1961)

Births
2 February – Libby Purves, radio presenter.
12 May – Jenni Murray, journalist, presenter of Woman's Hour
5 June – Jonathan Fryer, foreign correspondent, writer and politician (died 2021)
8 July – Sarah Kennedy, radio presenter

See also 
 1950 in British music
 1950 in British television
 1950 in the United Kingdom
 List of British films of 1950

References 

 
Years in British radio
Radio